Wat Phra Kaeo Don Tao (literally "monastery of the Emerald Buddha on the water jar knoll") is the principal Buddhist temple in Lampang, Thailand. The temple was founded by the first Mon ruler of Lampang. The Emerald Buddha was enshrined at this temple from 1434 to 1468, when King Tilokaraj relocated the image to Wat Phra Singh in Chiang Mai. It is flanked by a Burmese-style mondop, with a pyatthat spired roof, that was commissioned by Lampang's governor in 1909.

References

External links

Buddhist temples in Lampang Province
Overseas Burmese Buddhist temples